Aethes hoenei is a species of moth of the family Tortricidae. It was described by Razowski in 1964. It is found in Russia (the southern Ural), Japan and China (Hunan, Jiangxi, Liaoning, Shaanxi, Zhejiang).

References

hoenei
Moths described in 1964
Moths of Asia
Moths of Japan
Taxa named by Józef Razowski